Swieqi United Football Club is a Maltese football and futsal club representing the municipality of Swieqi. The club was created by a group of University Students and Swieqi residents. Founded in 2009, the club enjoys a good fan-base especially amongst young people on the island. The team plays in Orange shirts (a fusion of the red and yellow of Swieqi) and use blue as the away kit. The club is renowned for giving young players the opportunity to play football  and the club's symbol is the Owl – a reference to the students who founded Swieqi United F.C.

The club is registered with the Malta Football Association and is registered with the Malta Sports Council. Despite being set up a mere eight years ago, the club has already achieved promotion to the 1st Division, has opened its own premises, launched an Under 19s team and established a Youth Academy.

Logo/Crest

The name is not only popular but also acts as a symbol. "The town of Swieqi, the village of Ta' l-Ibrag and the hamlet of Madliena have all merged hence UNITED into one team: Swieqi United FC". The 3 colours on the new crest (yellow, red and blue) represent these 3 entities which form the basis of the club's kits when competing in official MFA Competitions. The badge itself is primarily made up of Swieqi's colours. Modelled on the Swieqi Coat of arms it incorporates the red and yellow (merged into orange) symbolising the valleys and fields of Ta' l-Ibrag and Madliena. The blue and white represent the waterflow, the 'saqa' which gives its name to our beloved town

Club history

For many years, people were surprised that such a locality, with a population of over 8,000 people didn't have a football team. Talks of forming an Ibrag Football Club in the 1990s never materialized and in 2007 an application for a Swieqi Football Club was rejected by the MFA. However, it was always a question of 'when' rather than 'if' and the youths of Swieqi were always determined to make sure Swieqi was represented in the National Football League. The initial five people who 'founded' the club were: Michael Calleja, Ralph Agius Fernandez, Gavin Ellul, Justin Fenech & Mauro Miceli.

The club was approved unanimously by the Council of the Malta Football Association on Thursday, 28 May 2009 and the addition of Swieqi meant that the number of clubs in Division 3 increased to 20 as Qrendi and Mtarfa who placed last in Sections A and B respectively both re-applied and were approved. Swieqi would start competing competitively in 2009–10 MFA season.

The club's main colour was chosen to be orange since no other team in Malta used this colour at the time and Swieqi United wanted to create an up-market and elegant brand. The 14 April 2009, will certainly go down in the history of Swieqi United FC as its first ever committee was chosen to represent the club and in effect, the locality as a whole.

On 24 June 2009, the acting committee held the first ever Annual General Meeting at 119, Triq il-Qasam, Swieqi. Club President Ralph Agius Fernandez, Secretary Michael Calleja and Vice-President Gavin Ellul addressed the members of the club and described the work that had been done, together with the objectives and future projects. The nominations for the committee were also held, and thus the official committee for the 2009/2010 MFA season was announced.

On 28 June 2009, Roberto Debrincat was confirmed as Swieqi United's first ever manager.

2009–10

On 13 July 2009, Swieqi United took part in the first MFA 3rd Division draws of their history. The new club was pitted against Zejtun Corinthians FC, Naxxar Lions FC, Gudja United FC, Attard FC, Xghajra Tornadoes FC, Qrendi FC, Sirens FC, Kirkop United FC and Santa Lucija FC.

The Orange were scheduled to play their historic, first-ever league match against the club from the seaside village of Xghajra.

The Quick Keno Division II/III Knock-Out draws were held on Tuesday, 21 July 2009. Swieqi United were drawn against Gudja United FC, Gzira United FC and Zebbug Rangers FC in Group 1.

Swieqi registered its first ever victory on 18 August 2009, in a friendly game vs Kirkop United. Daniel Bianco and Brian Grech scored in a 2–1 win.

Swieqi gained its first ever point in the Quick KENO Knockout on Saturday 12 September 2009. Trailing 0–3 against Gzira, Swieqi managed to score 3 goals and could have added a fourth in the final minutes. It was a dramatic end to a pulsating encounter.

Despite being their first season, Swieqi managed to register some positive wins throughout the campaign. On 1 October 2009 at the Centenary Stadium, Ta' Qali, Swieqi played their first game in the BOV Third Division against Xghajra Tornadoes, winning the game 3–2. The support pushed the team on to claim a marvellous victory on their league debut. Notable wins included 3–1 vs Gudja, 4–0 vs Santa Lucia and 4–3 vs Qrendi. Also, Swieqi played some excellent football but were unlucky to lose 0–1 against table-toppers Naxxar Lions. Swieqi ended the 2009–10 season in 8th place with 16 points.

2010–11

Swieqi United started the 2010–11 campaign quite promisingly. Contrary to the previous campaign, the KO Quick Keno Competition proved to be much more fruitful as Swieqi lost 0–2 to Senglea Athletic and registered draws against Santa Venera and Gharghur. The league campaign also got off to a very good start with Swieqi registering 3 wins from the first four matches propelling them into second place in the league by the end of October. However, a series of injuries and suspensions were coupled with a bad run which saw the club lose 3 matches on the trot sliding down the table. Nevertheless, some changes were made to the squad and the Christmas period proved to be more satisfying as Swieqi won the Noel Muscat Cup vs Pembroke Athleta (3–1) and were unlucky to lose the Strickland Cup 2–4 on penalties against Mtarfa.

A nightmarish end to 2010 was put to bed as 2011 kicked off with some good performances most notably a good 2–2 draw against Attard, wins against Qrendi and Mtarfa and a record 8–0 victory against Xghajra. A 1–0 win against Santa Lucija was enough to ensure Swieqi consolidated a mid-table position in the league standings.

Swieqi United ended the 2010–11 season in the 6th place (out of 11) with 25 points.

At the end of the season, Edward Vella was crowned 'Club Player of the year', with goaler Ryan Marmara 'Most improved player of the year, Captain John Debono won the 'Players Player of the Year' whilst Christopher Dalli won 'Most dedicated player of the season'

2011–12

Swieqi United began the 2011–12 season with a new manager – Roland Sollars who joined the club from Sirens. Swieqi made some major changes to the team and brought in many young players many of which came on loan from Melita F.C. The team was knocked out by eventual Gozitan champions Xewkija Tigers in the first round of the FA Trophy losing 0–5.

The league campaign had started with a draw against Fgura United (2–2), before losing to Ghaxaq and Santa Lucija. Thereupon, Swieqi embarked on a positive run beating Xghajra and Mgarr. A slump in fortunes then followed, although Swieqi did register some positive results during the season such as a 3–1 victory against title challengers Ghaxaq, a 6–2 win vs Kalkara and a 0–0 draw against eventual section winners Pembroke Athleta. Swieqi finished the season in 9th place with 29 points.

Steven Diacono (on loan from Melita) won Swieqi United's 'Player of the Season Award'

2012–13

Swieqi kicked off the season in great fashion defeating Mdina Knights 2–1 in the FA Trophy and racking up three wins out of four in the early stages of the League campaign. (Santa Lucija 2–0, Marsa 1–0 and Mtarfa 4–1). Everyone expected the club to push forward but some internal problems led to coach Sollars resigning on 1 December and the club never recovered from this blow, losing games by high scores and never recovering confidence.

Things only picked up when during the end of the season, coach Roberto Debrincat was re-appointed Head coach and results improved, at one point notching four wins out of seven games. (Wins vs Attard (2–0), Ghaxaq (2–0), Ta' Xbiex (1–0) and Kalkara (1–0). Nevertheless, despite coach Debrincat's timely intervention, Swieqi would end their most difficult and disappointing season in a lowly position thereby not accomplishing initial expectations.

2013–14

Thankfully, the 2013–14 season would prove to be much more successful for the club! Not only did the team improve but the club managed to gain promotion to the second division for the very first time in its history. Welcoming on board Mario Mifsud as Club Technical Director and with Roberto Debrincat reconfirmed as Manager, the coaching staff undertook the difficult task of rebuilding an underachieving team.

With fresh players brought in, a renewed sense of optimism generated throughout the club given the sparkling new premises launched, Swieqi embarked on a determined assault to ensure promotion would be secured. The first three games of the season were won quite comfortably before the Orange stumbled to careless wins vs Marsaxlokk and Mgarr. Thereupon, the Orange went on a 5 match winning sequence beating: Santa Venera, Attard, Luqa, Mtarfa and Santa Lucija. Facing the top teams in the section, Swieqi then drew against Xghajra, beat Ghaxaq and drew again in the top of the table clash with Sirens.

The second round started very well and Swieqi kept marching on solidly and aggressively. 6 straight wins (Ta’ Xbiex, Kalkara, Qrendi, Marsaxlokk, Mgarr & Santa Venera) were followed by an unwelcome defeat v Attard (3–4), but two wins vs Luqa St. Andrew's (2–0) and a win vs Mtarfa (1–0) ensured Swieqi were promoted to the Second Division for the first time in their history – certainly a remarkable feat given that the club was only founded a mere 5 years ago!

2014–15

This season was also a landmark season for a number of reasons. Primarily, the Under 17s team competed in the league (Section D) and achieved a remarkable 4th place. Swieqi also introduced their women's team to the league championship and the ladies achieved some great results despite it also being their maiden year.

With regards to the Seniors team, several changes were made in the summer in order to make the team more competitive. Swieqi got off to a great start in Division 2 beating Mellieha 4–0 with newcomer Leontiev Konda grabbing a hat-trick. By Christmas, the Orange were in 4th place having just gone on a 4-game unbeaten run (including 3 wins and a draw). However, a post-new year slump followed with the Orange losing some crucial games but recovering quickly by beating Zejtun 1–0 (and achieving the double over them) and holding Zabbar to a 0–0 draw. The battle to avoid relegation culminated with a game against Dingli. Both clubs needed the win and Swieqi won when it mattered by 2 goals to 1 (with goals from Matthew Asciak and Omar Smeir). The Orange ended the season with 33 points – certainly an achievement for their first year in 2nd Division.

The form team of the season was however the Under 19 squad. Bolstered by a year's experience in Section E, the Orange were in no mood to be complacent throughout the campaign though they were mightily challenged by Xghajra throughout the season. With Neil Farrugia in stunning form, the Orange continued to rack up with after win and Promotion to Section D was finally sealed when Swieqi beat St. George's 4–0 at the Sirens ground. With the race to the title going right down to the wire, Swieqi had to beat Mtarfa at Rabat on the final day of the season to ensure the Championship. Swieqi prevailed in a tight encounter thanks to goals from Erik Gollcher and Daniel Bezzina. It was truly a fitting end to a team which had dominated the Division from start to finish!

2015–16

The 2015–16 season would prove to be a very challenging and tough campaign for the Orange. Under the guidance of new Manager Billy Mock, Swieqi sought to revamp their youth policy and promote minors players for the first team. Nevertheless, with a reduced budget and entirely new coaching staff, Swieqi struggled for much of the Second Division campaign but did manage to survive when they decisively beat Kirkop United 2–0 in the penultimate game of the season. Throughout the year, 10 minors players managed to make their first team debut.

The Youth (Under-19) League campaign was very positive. The Minors managed to finish in 3rd place in their maiden season in Section D. Under the astute management of Rodney Bugeja and Gilbert Micallef, the squad managed to end the season on a high after a slow start. The Minors managed to wrap up some decisive wins most notably beating Gzira 4–0, Santa Venera 2–1 and Zurrieq 7–2. This was also the first year that the Under 17s debuted in Section B. Despite enduring a very difficult campaign (finishing bottom of their section), the Orange still performed bravely throughout all encounters and registered some positive results such as 2–2 draw v Kirkop and a 0–2 loss vs Valletta.

The Women's Team were also quite successful and went agonizingly close to winning promotion to the Women's Premier Division. Finishing second in 2nd Division after Gozo F.C., Swieqi's Women's team lost the play-off encounter vs Kirkop 0–1 at the Centenary Stadium. Despite the disappointment, the team could still take great pride in their achievements (having only been formed 2 years ago).

Finally, the Futsal team also did Swieqi proud ending up in the Maltese Futsal Elite Division!

2016–17

The 2016–17 season got off to the worst possible start with Swieqi United losing 3 points after Attard won a protest after the Orange had fielded an ineligible player. Despite this setback, the Orange went beyond all expectations in the league and managed to register some crucial victories to gain an initial momentum which would prove vital. New signings in particular Kyle Muscat and Sean Gatt Baldacchino provided much needed stability to a team which was already on the way up and with the additions of Roderick Taliana, foreigner Ion-Alin Margarit and Matthew Laferla – the group started to gel and grow stronger. The Orange grabbed some fine wins, narrowly losing against the top teams and ended up the season in 5th place out of 14 teams. Coaches Billy Mock and Rodney Bugeja had utilised more than 20 minors players with the Seniors team thereby highlighting Swieqi's philosophy of promoting youth and giving them a chance.

The Under 19s also had an amazing season finally clinching promotion to Section C after a titanic battle in Section D with Santa Lucija, Birzebbugia and Luqa St. Andrew's. The Orange lost only two games all season [both against Sta. Lucija] and played some awesome football along the way. Nicholas Schembri was particularly prolific for the Orange scoring over 30 goals throughout the season and helping the Orange achieve the much coveted promotion. It took a final day win against Birzebbugia to confirm promotion. With Swieqi needing a win to seal the title, the Northerners displayed their superiority by hammering Birzebbuga 6–0 to ensure their credentials as the top team in Section D. It is worth nothing that the 19s also reached the Quarter-finals of the Youth KO (losing 1–2 to Melita) and for the first time ever, an IASC team was introduced with the aim of giving more young players the chance in an amateur competition.

The Under 17s also had quite a positive season placing 4th in Section C and gaining much needed experience. Led by Andrea Vella and Julian Bonello, the young Orange gained some respectable results beating the likes of Zabbar St. Patrick's and Fgura United along the way. The Under 15s, well marshalled by Gilbert Micallef and Justin Rizzo managed to win promotion to Section D despite losing the play-off vs Marsascala (1–3). It was a very positive season for this age group which was playing against more physically imposing squads. The future certainly is very bright for both these sections.

Our Women's team finally managed to gain their first major silverware winning the BOV 2nd Division in clinical fashion (losing only one game all season). The group was expertly led by new coach Keith Gouder (assisted by Jochen Lenders), who managed to win promotion with a couple of games to spare. Another milestone was reached when Emma Moore was crowned BOV 2nd Division top scorer for 2016–17.

Finally, our Futsal team competed once again in the top echelon of Maltese Futsal. They took part in the Elite League and finished fourth behind the likes of Luxol St. Andrews', Valletta F.C. and Hamrun Spartans. It was certainly a positive season for this group. It must also be stated that the club also opted to field a Futsal Under-21 team which gained some respectable results along the way. The group was mainly used to introduce young players to futsal in the hope that more footballers will pursue this sport.

2017–18

The Men's Seniors squad managed to ensure a successful end to a very memorable season when they defeated Zabbar St. Patrick's 3–0 in the First Division play-off. This was a hugely successful season for the club when a very young team [with an average age of 21.6], against huge odds managed to win promotion after some fantastic football along the way. It was the culmination of a tremendous three-year project which was commenced by Billy Mock and Rodney Bugeja. Throughout the campaign, the team played a dynamic style of play with high-pressing and quick counterattack.

The Women's Team endured a long, tough season with plenty of food for thought. The squad is still in a process of being re-built but there is plenty of optimism for the future with the imminent launch of a Women's youth team.

The Under 19s also capped off a great season by winning Promotion to Section C (also completing an entire rnd unbeaten) and played against some quality sides (including Premier League outfits Naxxar Lions and Tarxien Rainbows) but managed to beat them nevertheless. An excellent coaching staff also guided the boys to a second successive Youth KO Quarter-final where they bowed out to eventual winners Mosta F.C. The IASC Squad also saw the introduction of more and more young players in the team. The idea was to keep players fit and ensure necessary game time especially for those players that needed more time on the pitch.

The Futsal Seniors' Squad did not reach their target but still managed to retain their 'Elite' status. Plenty of lessons were learned along the way and the group will get stronger. The Squad is performing miracles with a small budget and few resources hence it is certainly punching above its weight. The Futsal 21s had a very positive season.  A project which was greatly commended by everyone in local football, saw the club introduce more players into futsal.

The Under 17s ended the season on a strong note despite a slow start. The group played some fantastic football along the way and agonizingly missed out on promotion but the future looks very bright for this squad. Our Under 15s also managed to win back-to-back promotions and qualified for the group stages for 2018–19!

2018–19

The Men's Senior Squad participated in the BOV 1st Division for the first time in their history. It was overall was a very satisfying season both in terms of league position and football played. The Squad managed to retain their status with a couple of games to play. Moreover, a number of historical results were achieved [including two wins vs San Gwann, wins against Vittoriosa, Mqabba & Lija Athletic). Swieqi United ended the campaign in 8th place with 34 points.  The Women's team did the best they could, and the players tried their very best but lost the final decisive match against Luxol Raiders condemning the squad to second place in Section B.

The Men's Under 19 Squad participated for the first time in Section B and managed to retain their status. Aptly guided by Gilbert Micallef and Nick Debono, it was a competitive league, but the team managed a good number of performances and an overall positive season. The squad also reached the quarter-finals of the Youth Knock-Out for the third consecutive season. This was also the very first time that a Woman's Under 19 team was assembled after a very busy summer involving recruitment. Despite many challenges, the squad managed to achieve an aggregate of 6 points. The players produced a very good effort overall and were very determined through dogged displays. There is room for improvement but also potential thanks to Andrew Azzopardi who is managing the group.

The Under 17s Squad (Men) competed in Section B for the second time ever in the club's history. It certainly was quite a tough league and a challenging year with some very tough results however the team managed to survive in the final weeks of the season. The Under 15s Squad (Men) played in Section C which was quite a tough league and a challenging year for all involved. The team managed to survive despite plenty of obstacles and challenges presented.
 
The Seniors Futsal Team managed to retain their elite status. The squad had an overall good season considering the resources and budgeting...as it is not easy competing at this level. The Futsal Under 21s Squad (Men) made significant improvement considering a very slow start to the campaign. A number of good wins were secured in the latter part of the season ensuring the squad ended with 15 points. There is currently a lot of potential and many promising players are coming through the ranks.

2019–20

The Men’s Senior Squad ended up in 10th place from 14 clubs in the league before the league was terminated due to COVID-19. The team had six games to go before the league ended. Throughout the year, SUFC played a lot of games with young players and therefore we cannot be unhappy with the overall results. The club's overall record was 5 wins, 6 draws and 8 losses.

The Men's Under 19 squad ended up in 5th place from 10 clubs, but two points off 2nd place. Had the team won the last game (vs Zabbar St Patrick, where the match finished 4-4), the squad would have been promoted to Section A. The team is now established in Section B and have shown that they are no pushovers.

The Men’s U17 Squad ended up last in Section B with 5 points. The boys faced off against some big teams in Mosta, Birkirkara, Floriana, Hibernians etc. On the other hand, the Men’s U15 Squad competed in Section B for the first time.  The group finished last without any points. This particular section had some tough teams including Hibernians, Valletta and Balzan were all in this league.

The Women’s Senior Squad ended up in 3rd place overall. There was an improvement from the previous year – between Swieqi United and Mgarr United, there wasn’t a huge difference, but there is a big gap between the club and Birkirkara (who won the league unbeaten). For a first season at this level, it was positive overall, although we could do better.

The Women’s U19 Squad ended up in 2nd place overall, three points off first placed Mgarr. We could unfortunately not beat Mgarr in the league but the team should be rewarded for finishing in 2nd place, and thus encourage the players to keep on working hard. The Women’s U15 Squad won the league with just one loss all season (vs Birkirkara). The girls played very well overall and won the league quite comfortably.

The Futsal Senior Squad, for the second year in a row, parted ways with the Seniors' coach. The group finished last out of four teams and we had a disruptive season overall. The Futsal Development Squad had a positive season and we ended up 2nd in the league and were in the playoffs for first place. Of note is that the last four additions to the National Team all played for Swieqi United at a point in time.

2020–21

This was a season whereby the squads continued to show how competitive they are and that with the building blocks in place, there is the chance for them to do well, competitively. The Club continues to be included in every level of football offered by the MFA and YFA and will continue to strive to be a pioneer in the local footballing scene.

At the time of abandonment, Swieqi United had played more than 75% of its games in the league. There were six games left to play. The club ended up in joint 4th place in the league, level on points with Zebbug Rangers. The club had a very competitive first half of the season and were in the hunt to finish among the top three; results were more mixed subsequent to the end of the first round. However, the squad is young and inexperienced, and therefore a tailing off was to be expected, to a certain extent. Therefore, the club did well to finish where it finished in the standings, especially when one considers the budget vis-à-vis other clubs in the league. Ibrahim Salis was second top scorer in the league (14 goals). Our overall record was 10 wins, 4 draws and 8 losses.

From an U19 perspective Swieqi United once again played Section B football. At the time of abandonment, Swieqi United had concluded its first round commitments, having played 11 games from 22. The club ended up in 7th place from 12 clubs, 7 points off the 2nd placed Santa Lucia (who played a game more) but well clear of the bottom three sides, being Naxxar, Rabat and Mqabba. The team once again showed immense character throughout the season, in particular in the 2-1 win over Rabat, when half the squad did not play due to Covid-19 yet the match went ahead. The team will once again compete in Section B next season, due to the league being abandoned.

Insofar as U17s are concerned, Swieqi United played Section C football. At the time of abandonment, the first round had just been concluded and the Club finished it top of the standings on 18 points, with 6 wins and 1 loss. The club played some positive football and obtained good results throughout the season. 

Men’s U15 Squad: Swieqi United played Section C football. The club should have been in Section B as a 2-1 win over Mosta meant that Swieqi United placed 2nd in the preliminary round standings, but the club fell foul of an archaic rule regarding identification, Mosta appealed the result and it was duly overturned. At the time of abandonment, the first round had just been concluded and the Club finished it 4th in the standings on 8 points, with 2 wins, 2 draws and 2 losses. 

Women’s Senior Squad - The club, once again, improved on the previous season, ending as runners-up
in the league for the first time. The gap between Swieqi United and Mgarr United was bridged, and while Birkirkara finished top of the standings by 5 points and with a game in hand, the gap between us and them is also narrowing – we obtained our first point against them this season. This was the team’s second season at a very competitive level.

Women’s U19 Squad - We digressed from our standards in previous seasons, as at the time of abandonment, the club was in 3rd place overall, behind Birkirkara and a vastly improved Raiders GFC. 

Women’s U15 Squad At the time of abandonment, the squad was 2nd overall and level on points with Birkirkara, albeit having played a game more. The girls played very well overall.

Futsal

The Club currently boasts two futsal teams. A Men's Seniors team and a development team - Ibragg Futsal.  The team has successfully managed to retain its 'Elite' status throughout the past couple of seasons and is a well respected force in Maltese football. The futsal section was discontinued in 2021.

Training facilities

Swieqi United recently inaugurated a new training facility in Pembroke (an 8 a side football pitch). The ground forms part of the Pembroke Saint Claire Primary School and will serve as the main hub of the club's operations. As from 2013 to 2014, it will also serve as the Nursery and Minors base.

Under 19s [Minors] and Youth Academy

Swieqi United FC has an Under 19 (Minors) Squad which participates in the MFA Youth League. The Under 19s finished 4th in their first ever season in Section E and won the same competition the following year. They also finished 3rd in their maiden season in Section D. During the 2016–17 Season, the U19s achieved promotion to Section C winning the league in a convincing manner. Throughout the 2017–18 season, the club managed back-to-back promotions, this time beating Msida St. Joseph 6–1 on the final day of the season to ensure a historic promotion to Section B of the National Youth Competition. The Under 19s also managed to reach the Quarter-finals of the National Youth Cup for two successive seasons [throughout 2016/17 and 2017/18].

The club has also established a Youth Academy which caters for the young footballers between the ages of 5 to 17. The Club's Under 17 Squad finished fourth in their maiden season in Section D and their second season bottom of Section B.

Swieqi United operates rather differently from other clubs. The organisation strongly believes in a ‘One Team – One Club’ Philosophy meaning that all sectors are treated equally, there is no preferential treatment towards certain players and coaches and the Academy [U5 – U17s] and Seniors team [U19s, Men & Women's Seniors Teams & Futsal Squads] are managed by ONE committee.

The Philosophy of the Academy can be summarised as follows:

•          The Academy focuses on the holistic development of young individuals; every player will be engaged to learn and develop his/her skills on and off the pitch, such as self-discipline, communication, concentration, team work, self-motivation, leadership etc.

•          The Academy's programme for learning is naturally centered on football activities (skill/tactical), educating our players on aspects of fitness, nutrition and healthy living.

•          The Academy provides a welcoming environment, which is professionally structured to offer the opportunity for young players to thrive and gain success in a fun way.

•          The Academy will provide a disciplined environment where the players will work together to take pride in themselves, their surroundings and the football club.

•          The Academy will promote and support good outcomes in terms of health, development and educational achievement of our players.

•          The Academy benefits from affiliations with local and foreign clubs and sport associations in order to offer the players a variety of pathways aimed at further development.

Women's team

During the 2014–15 season, Swieqi also launched its first ever Woman's Squad which takes part in the National League. They finished runners-up in the Second Division during the 2015–16 season and went on to win the Second Division the following season.

Kitwear

Swieqi United's current home kit consists of an orange shirt, with black shorts and orange socks whilst the away strip consists of a grey top with black shorts and socks. The second kit's grey in colour. A third is also occasionally used and it consists of a blue top. Swieqi's kits are manufactured by Nike.

Here are the manufacturers of the club's uniforms since 2009:

Franchise Information

Since 2009, Swieqi United FC represents the municipality of Swieqi which incorporates the following areas: Swieqi proper, Ibrag and Madliena, together with High Ridge, Upper Gardens and Victoria Gardens. The total area population is about 9,000 people.

Honours

Men's Seniors Squad

- BOV 1st Division Play-off: Winners (2017–18).

- BOV 3rd Division: Runners-Up (2013–14).

Minor Honours:

- Noel Muscat Cup Winners
2010 (1)

- Strickland Cup Winners
2013, 2014 (2)

Under 19s Squad

- Youth League Section B: Winners (2021-22)

– Youth League Section C: Winners (2017–18)

– Youth League Section D: Winners (2016–17)

– Youth League Section E: Winners (2014–15)

Under 15s Squad (Men):

– Youth FA Section D: Runners-Up (2017–18)

– Youth FA Section E: Runners-Up (2016–17)

Women's Squad:

– BOV Women's League: Runners-up: 2 (2020-21, 2021-22)

– BOV Women's K/O: Runners-up: 1 (2021-22)

– BOV Women's Second Division: Winners (2016–17)

– BOV Women's Second Division: Runners-Up (2015–16)

– BOV Women's Fair Play Award: Winners (2014–15)

Under 16s Squad (Women):

– MFA Under 16 K/O: Winners (2021-22)

Under 15s Squad (Women):

– MFA Under 15 League: Winners (2019-20)

Futsal Squad:

- FMA Futsal Elite Division: Runners-up (2020-21)

– FMA Futsal Fair Play Award: Winners (2014–15)

Other achievements

(i) MFPA (Malta Football Players Association)
Special Award: Winners (2016–17)

(ii) MFA (Malta Football Association)
Fair Play Award: Winners (2016–17)

(iii) MFA (Malta Football Association)
Roderick Taliana: Nomination for BOV 2nd Div. Player of the year 2017–18

(iv) BOV Women's 2nd Division Top Scorer:
Emma Moore (2016–17)

(v) Youth League Section D Top Scorer:
Nicholas Schembri – 21 goals (2016–17)

(vi) YFA U15 Top Scorer:
Daniele Ferlaino (2016–17)

(vii) IASC Good Conduct Shield Winners: 2016–17

(viii) The Club was awarded the Gieh is-Swieqi award in 2020.

Board & Management 2022/23

SUFC Squad 2020–2021

The current squad:

Swieqi United Staff 2022–23

References

External links
Swieqi United official website
Malta Football Association Official Website
Maltafootball.com

Association football clubs established in 2009
Football clubs in Malta
2009 establishments in Malta
Swieqi